Commemoration may refer to:

Commemoration (Anglicanism), a religious observance in Churches of the Anglican Communion
Commemoration (liturgy), insertion in one liturgy of portions of another
Memorialization
"Commemoration", a song by the 3rd and the Mortal from the album Painting on Glass

See also 
 Commemorative (disambiguation)